The British Rail Class 305 was an alternating current (AC) electric multiple unit (EMU). Under the pre-1973 British Rail numbering system, the class was known as AM5. When TOPS was introduced, the class became Class 305.

Subclasses
Class 305 had three subclasses:

305/1 3-car units, standard class accommodation only, 52 units built in 1960
305/2 4-car units, first and standard class accommodation, 19 units built in 1959
305/3 4-car units, first and standard class accommodation, 8 units converted from 305/1 in 1988 by adding a TC from  units
305/9 3-car unit, non-passenger departmental conversion, converted 1984

Operations
305/1 units were generally deployed on inner suburban services on the Lea Valley lines out of London Liverpool Street to Chingford, Enfield Town and Hertford East. However, they were also used on the Great Eastern lines out of London Liverpool Street and occasionally worked out of their ‘normal’ operating area when coupled to a 305/2 unit or any of the compatible EMUs in use at the time. These units were distinguished by their lower backed seating. 305/1 units were replaced from 1980 onwards by British Rail Class 315 units. They were not generally used elsewhere, but a small number of units, are believed to have operated around Manchester for a brief period in the mid 1990s. All examples of the subclass were scrapped.

Like the 305/1 units, they could occasionally be seen on other services out of Liverpool Street and were sometimes coupled to other compatible EMUs for multiple workingScotRail .

One unit was converted in 1984 for use as a mobile classroom in connection with the East Coast Main Line electrification project, becoming unit 305935, painted in InterCity livery. One of the driving vehicles contained blue asbestos and was subsequently replaced with a driving vehicle from a withdrawn Class 302 set, forming a hybrid set but retaining the same unit number (305935). The unit was later used in East Anglia as part of the Great Eastern electrification and was deployed at Ipswich, Harwich and Cambridge.

The 305/2s were refurbished in the mid-late 1980s. As with the 308s, this involved moving first class to a driving trailer, new interior panels, new seats and fluorescent lights.

The 305/2s were initially replaced on the Lea Valley Line by British Rail Class 310 units during the late 1980s/early 1990s. Most of the 305/2s were overhauled at Doncaster, painted in Regional Railways livery and shortened to 3-car sets, before moving to the Manchester area, taking over services previously diagrammed by Class 304 units.

A handful were further repainted into Greater Manchester PTE livery, some regaining their TSO trailer and receiving additional luggage racks dedicated to the new Manchester Airport services. Once Class 323 units were in service, the 305s were gradually withdrawn, but a few retained on Hadfield services until track alignment was performed in 1997, allowing the longer bodied Class 323s to negotiate the sharp curves at Dinting station. The surviving units also occasionally turned up on other local services around Manchester, with the last 305 to work out of Stoke-on-Trent believed to be 305506 on 22 May 2000 on the 20:57 to Manchester.

5 305/5s (305501-502, 508, 517 and 519) moved to Glasgow Shields depot retaining their 4-car configuration, finishing their working lives running the route from Edinburgh Waverley to North Berwick. The last unit in service, 305517, ran its final service on 25 January 2002, operating the 17:15 North Berwick to Edinburgh Waverley, before going to scrap on 31 January 2002, along with 305501 and 305519.

Accidents and incidents

Preservation attempts
AC EMU Group aimed to save a Class 305 driving trailer, but by the time funding was found, they had all been scrapped, so a Class 308 driving trailer was saved instead.

References

Sources

Further reading

External links 

 ACEMU Group Website

305
Train-related introductions in 1959